is a 1996 Japanese film directed by Yoji Yamada. It is a sequel to Yamada's 1993 film A Class to Remember.

The film was Japan's submission to the 69th Academy Awards for the Academy Award for Best Foreign Language Film, but was not accepted as a nominee.

Cast
 Toshiyuki Nishida
 Hidetaka Yoshioka
 Masatoshi Nagase
 Ayumi Ishida
 Hiroshi Kanbe
 Pinko Izumi
 Hideko Hara
 Yoshiaki Umegaki
 Takashi Sasano
 Ayumi Hamasaki

Gakko series
 A Class to Remember (1993)
 Gakko II (1996)
 Gakko III aka A Class to Remember III (1998)
 Jyu Gosai Gakko  aka A Class to Remember IV (2000)

See also
 List of submissions to the 69th Academy Awards for Best Foreign Language Film
 List of Japanese submissions for the Academy Award for Best Foreign Language Film

References

External links

1996 films
Films directed by Yoji Yamada
Films with screenplays by Yôji Yamada
Films scored by Isao Tomita
1990s Japanese films

ja:学校 (映画)#学校II